Dačice is a town in Jindřichův Hradec District in the South Bohemian Region of the Czech Republic. It has about 7,100 inhabitants. The town centre is well preserved and is protected by law as an urban monument zone.

It is notable as the home of the sugar cube, which was invented here in 1843 by Jakob Christof Rad.

Administrative parts

Dačice is made up of town parts of Dačice I–V, and villages of Bílkov, Borek, Chlumec, Dolní Němčice, Hostkovice, Hradišťko, Lipolec, Malý Pěčín, Prostřední Vydří, Toužín and Velký Pěčín. Prostřední Vydří forms an exclave of the municipal territory.

Geography
Despite administratively being a part of the South Bohemian Region, the town lies in the historical land of Moravia. It lies in the Křižanov Highlands. The town is situated on the Moravian Thaya River. Its tributary is the Rybniční Stream, which supplies a numerous set of ponds located within the municipal territory.

History
The first written mention of Dačice is from 1183, when it was a settlement on crossroads of two trade routes. In 1377, Dačice was promoted to a town.

After Dačice was acquired by the family of Krajíř of Krajek in 1459, the town has experienced rapid development. In the 16th century, Krajíř invited Italian architects to the town and turned the simple Gothic town into a Renaissance one. The new town hall, two castles, new quarter around the castle, and the tower of the church were built. The Baroque era has been shown in 1660 by construction of Franciscan monastery, and in 1672–1677, when the Church of Saint Anthony of Padua was built next to the monastery.

Dačice suffered by a plague in 1680, and by extensive fire and several smaller fires, which caused destruction of Renaissance and Baroque look of the town. In the 19th century, the town was industrialized. In 1833, the first sugar refinery in Moravia was founded. In 1902, the town was connected with Telč and Slavonice by railway.

Until 1918, Datschitz – Dačice (Datschitz in 1850) was part of the Austrian monarchy (Austria side after the compromise of 1867), in the district with the same name, one of the 34 Bezirkshauptmannschaften in Moravia.

Demographics

Economy
THK Rhythm Automotive Czech a.s., part of the THK concern, is by far the largest employer in the town and one of the largest in the region.

Sights

The monastery complex with the Church of Saint Anthony of Padua, and the Church of Saint Lawrence are the most valuable preserved Baroque monuments and the main landmarks of the town. The monastery is still active and inaccessible for the public.

The Old Castle was built in 1572–1579 and served as the manor house until 1591, when the New Castle was built. The Old Castle now houses part of the municipal office. The Renaissance town hall is the most significant house of the square and still serves its original purpose. The New Castle, nowadays called Dačice Castle, was rebuilt in the 19th century from Renaissance to the current Empire form, and today it is open to the visitors. It also includes a  large English-style landscape park.

The invention of the sugar cube subject to permanent exposure in the Municipal Museum and Gallery, which is located in the southern wing of the Dačice Castle. In the town centre there is also a granite monument commemorating this event.

Notable people
Jakob Christof Rad (1799–1871), Austrian businessman, inventor of the sugar cube
Miloš Vystrčil (born 1960), politician

Twin towns – sister cities

Dačice is twinned with:
 Groß-Siegharts, Austria
 Urtenen-Schönbühl, Switzerland

References

External links

Dačice Castle

Cities and towns in the Czech Republic
Populated places in Jindřichův Hradec District
Moravia